The 1996–97 Primeira Divisão was the 63rd edition of top flight of Portuguese football. It started on 25 August 1996 with a match between Benfica and Braga, and ended on 15 June 1997. The league was contested by 18 clubs with Porto as the defending champions.

Porto won the league and qualified for the 1997–98 UEFA Champions League group stage, along with Sporting CP, who qualified for the second round, Boavista qualified for the 1997–98 UEFA Cup Winners' Cup first round, and Benfica, Braga and V. Guimarães qualified for the 1997–98 UEFA Cup; in opposite, Espinho, União de Leiria and Gil Vicente were relegated to the Liga de Honra. Mário Jardel  was the top scorer with 30 goals.

Promotion and relegation

Teams relegated to Liga de Honra
Felgueiras
Campomaiorense
Tirsense
Felgueiras, Campomaiorense and Tirsense, were consigned to the Liga de Honra following their final classification in 1995–96 season.

Teams promoted from Liga de Honra
Rio Ave
Vitória de Setúbal
Espinho

The other three teams were replaced by Rio Ave, Vitória de Setúbal and Espinho from the Liga de Honra.

Teams

Stadia and locations

Managerial changes

League table

Results

Top goalscorers

Source: Footballzz

Footnotes

External links
 Portugal 1996-97 - RSSSF (Jorge Miguel Teixeira)
 Portuguese League 1996/97 - footballzz.co.uk
 Portugal - Table of Honor - Soccer Library 

Primeira Liga seasons
Port
1996–97 in Portuguese football